Butterfly Pond, also known as Aldrich Brook, is a body of water in the town of Lincoln, in Providence County, Rhode Island.

References

Lakes of Providence County, Rhode Island
Lakes of Rhode Island
Lincoln, Rhode Island